Les Campbell (26 July 1935 – 10 November 2019) was an English footballer who played on the left wing in The Football League for Preston North End, Blackpool and Tranmere Rovers.

Campbell started his career with Wigan Athletic, making five appearances in the Lancashire Combination before turning professional and joining Preston North End in 1953. He also played professionally for Blackpool and Tranmere Rovers before returning to Wigan Athletic (then in the Cheshire League) in 1964, where me made a further 41 appearances. In 1965, he signed for Altrincham where he made 84 league appearances in three seasons with the club (119 appearances in all competitions). He left the club at the end of the 1967–68 season and joined Netherfield.

Campbell died on 10 November 2019, aged 84.

References

1935 births
2019 deaths
Footballers from Wigan
Association football wingers
English footballers
Wigan Athletic F.C. players
Preston North End F.C. players
Blackpool F.C. players
Tranmere Rovers F.C. players
Altrincham F.C. players
Kendal Town F.C. players
English Football League players